GABA receptor antagonists are drugs that  inhibit the action of GABA. In general these drugs produce stimulant and convulsant effects, and are mainly used for counteracting overdoses of sedative drugs.

Examples include bicuculline, securinine and metrazol, and the benzodiazepine GABAA receptor antagonist flumazenil.

Other agents which may have GABAA receptor antagonism include the antibiotic ciprofloxacin, tranexamic acid, thujone, ginkgo biloba, and kudzu.

See also
 GABAA receptor negative allosteric modulators

External links

References

 
Biochemistry